The Charleston White Sox were a Minor League Baseball team that played in the Class A South Atlantic League from 1959 to 1961. They were located in Charleston, South Carolina, and played their home games at Hampton Park. Known as the Charleston ChaSox in 1959 and renamed the White Sox in 1960, the team was named in reference to their Major League Baseball affiliate, the Chicago White Sox.

References

External links
Statistics from Baseball-Reference

1959 establishments in South Carolina
1961 disestablishments in South Carolina
Baseball teams established in 1959
Baseball teams disestablished in 1961
South Atlantic League (1904–1963) teams
Chicago White Sox minor league affiliates
Sports in Charleston, South Carolina